Judge Ludwig may refer to:

Brett H. Ludwig (born 1969), judge of the United States District Court for the Eastern District of Wisconsin
Edmund V. Ludwig (1928–2016), judge of the United States District Court for the Eastern District of Pennsylvania